Mount Jackson is a high and prominent mountain summit in the northern Sawatch Range of the Rocky Mountains of North America. The mountain was named in honor of photographer William Henry Jackson, who accompanied the Hayden Survey in the 1870s.

Mountain

See also

List of mountain peaks of North America
List of mountain peaks of the United States
List of mountain peaks of Colorado

References

External links

Jackson
Jackson
White River National Forest
Jackson